Cold Snap is an album by the American blues musician Albert Collins, released in 1986. The album was nominated for a Grammy Award in the "Best Traditional Blues Recording" category.

Production
The album was produced by Albert Collins, Bruce Iglauer, and Dick Shurman. Mel Brown, Jimmy McGriff, and the Uptown Horns played on Cold Snap.

Critical reception

Robert Christgau assigned the album a B, but called it an obvious attempt by Alligator to win for Collins a Grammy. The St. Petersburg Times deemed it "a hefty dose of Texas-style blues, augmented by the sounds of Chicago's south side." The Globe and Mail wrote that "Jimmy McGriff and the Uptown Horns contribute more smooth edges to music that has the usual Collins power but not the usual Collins urgency." 

The Chicago Tribune wrote: "The skeptical should head directly to 'Too Many Dirty Dishes', where Collins' riffs seem to be literally scrubbing the pots and pans." The Providence Journal-Bulletin declared that "what really strikes the listener this time is the masterful, ice-blue singing—tasty as a snow cone and brutal as frostbite—and the wry, semi-detached lyrics."

AllMusic opined that Collins is "at his best when he's just playing the blues, not when he's trying to sing."

Track listing

Personnel
Albert Collins - guitar, vocals
Mel Brown - rhythm guitar
Johnny Gayden - bass
Jimmy McGriff - organ
Allen Batts - keyboards
Morris Jennings - drums, percussion
Uptown Horns - horns
Arno Hecht - tenor saxophone
Crispin Cioe - alto and baritone saxophone
Hollywood Paul Litteral - trumpet
Bob Funk - trombone

References

Albert Collins albums
1986 albums
albums produced by Bruce Iglauer
Alligator Records albums